Kangle County (Xiao'erjing: کَانْ‌لِ ثِيًآ) is a county in the Linxia Hui Autonomous Prefecture, Gansu province of the People's Republic of China. With ethnic minority of the Dongxiang.

According to Chapter of Geography of History book of Song Dynasty, Kangle County was first established in 1073 (sixth year of the Emperor Shenzong of Song era,).

Administrative divisions
Kangle County is divided to 5 towns and 10 townships.
Towns

Townships

Climate

Sources 

County-level divisions of Gansu